Group C of the 1994 FIFA World Cup was one of six groups of four teams competing at the 1994 World Cup in the United States. The first match was played June 17, 1994 and the final games took place simultaneously on June 27, 1994.

The group consisted of the defending champion Germany, Bolivia, Spain, and South Korea. Germany won the group and Spain finished second.

Standings

Matches
All times local (EDT/UTC–4, CDT/UTC–5, PDT/UTC–7)

Germany vs Bolivia

Spain vs South Korea

Germany vs Spain

South Korea vs Bolivia

Bolivia vs Spain

Germany vs South Korea

References

 
 

Group C
Spain at the 1994 FIFA World Cup
Group
South Korea at the 1994 FIFA World Cup
Bolivia at the 1994 FIFA World Cup